Burg Kammerstein/ Ehrenfels is a castle in the town of Kammern im Liesingtal in Styria, Austria.

See also
List of castles in Austria

References

This article was initially translated from the German Wikipedia.

Castles in Styria